Scott McNeill Sieburth is an American chemist.

Sieburth's parents were the librarian Janice Fae Boston and the biologist John McNeill Sieburth.

Sieburth completed a bachelor's of science degree at Worcester Polytechnic Institute in 1977, and obtained a doctorate from Harvard University in 1983. He is a professor at Temple University. He was elected a fellow of the American Chemical Society in 2010.

References

20th-century American chemists
21st-century American chemists
Living people
Year of birth missing (living people)
Temple University faculty
Harvard University alumni
Worcester Polytechnic Institute alumni
Fellows of the American Chemical Society